Dainenbutsu-ji (大念仏寺) is a Buddhist temple in Hirano-ku, Osaka, Japan. It was founded in 1127.

See also 
Thirteen Buddhist Sites of Osaka
List of National Treasures of Japan (writings: Chinese books)

External links 
 Official website 

Buddhist temples in Osaka
Hirano-ku, Osaka
12th-century Buddhist temples
12th-century establishments in Japan